The 1998 James Madison Dukes football team was an American football team that represented James Madison University during the 1998 NCAA Division I-AA football season as a member of the Atlantic 10 Conference. In their fourth year under head coach Alex Wood, the team compiled a 3–8 record.

Schedule

References

James Madison
James Madison Dukes football seasons
James Madison Dukes football